Sportpark Klein Zwitserland is a field hockey and cricket ground in The Hague, the Netherlands. The first recorded cricket match held on the ground came in 1987 when the Netherlands Women played Ireland Women. The ground later held six ICC Trophy matches in the 1990. The ground held a Women's One Day International in 2003 between Japan Women and Scotland Women in the IWCC Trophy.

References

External links
Sportpark Klein Zwitserland at ESPNcricinfo
Sportpark Klein Zwitserland at CricketArchive

 

HC Klein Zwitserland
Sports venues in The Hague
Cricket grounds in the Netherlands
Field hockey venues in the Netherlands